Play it again, Sam may refer to:

 A misquotation of the line "Play it, Sam" from the 1942 film Casablanca.
 Play It Again, Sam (play), a 1969 Broadway play by Woody Allen
 Play It Again, Sam (film), the 1972 film based on Allen's play
 "Play It Again, Sam", a song on the album You Brainstorm, I Brainstorm, but Brilliance Needs a Good Editor by Manchester Orchestra
 A work for solo viola by Milton Babbitt, written in 1989
 Branding used by Superior Software, to re-release their old titles
 PIAS Recordings, an international record label, also known as "Play It Again Sam Records"

See also 
 PIAS (disambiguation)

Misquotations